This is a list of public and private Argentine universities, grouped by region and type. Public universities are mostly state funded, while private universities require some form of tuition payment.

Nationwide

Public
National Technological University: Official website

Buenos Aires City and Buenos Aires Province

Public
Argentine Federal Police Institute: Official website
Higher Education Army Institute: Official website
National University of Arts: Official website
National University Arturo Jauretche: Official website
National University of Avellaneda: Official website
National University of Center Buenos Aires: Official website
National University of General San Martín: Official website
National University of General Sarmiento: Official website
National University Guillermo Brown: Official website
National University of Hurlingham: Official website
National University of José C. Paz: Official website
National University of La Matanza: Official website
National University of La Plata: Official website
National University of Lanús: Official website
National University of Lomas de Zamora: Official website
National University of Luján: Official website
National University of Mar del Plata: Official website
National University of Moreno: Official website
National University of Northwestern Buenos Aires: Official website
National University Raúl Scalabrini Ortiz: Official website
National University of San Antonio de Areco: Official website
National University of Quilmes: Official website
National University of the South: Official website
National University of Tres de Febrero: Official website
National University of the West: Official website
University of Buenos Aires: Official website
University of National Defense: website

Private
Argentine Atlantis University: Official website
Argentine University of Enterprise: Official website
Austral University: Official website
Buenos Aires Institute of Technology: Official website
Buenos Aires Italian Hospital Institute: Official website
CAECE University: Official website
Catholic University of La Plata: Official website
Diocesan School of Social Service: Official website
ESEADE Institute: Official website
FASTA University: Official website
Favaloro University: Official website
H. A. Barceló Foundation Institute of Health Sciences: Official website
Interamerican Open University: Official website
John F. Kennedy Argentine University: Official website
Maimonides University: Official website
Naval Institute: Official website
Pontifical Catholic University of Argentina: Official website
Torcuato di Tella University: Official website
University of the Argentine Social Museum: Official website
University of Belgrano: Official website
University of CEMA: Official website
Fundación Universidad del Cine: Official website
University of Enterprise and Social Sciences: Official website
University of Flores: Official website
University of the Merchant Marine: Official website
University of Moron: Official website
University of Palermo: Official website
University of San Andrés: Official website
University of the Savior: Official website
University School of Theology: Official website
TECH Technological University (TECH Universidad Tecnológica): Official website

Northwest

Public
National University of Catamarca: Official website
National University of Jujuy: Official website
National University of La Rioja: Official website
National University of Salta: Official website
National University of Santiago del Estero: Official website
National University of Tucumán: Official website

Private
Catholic University of Salta: Official website
Catholic University of Santiago del Estero: Official website
Saint Paul's University: Official website
Saint Thomas Aquinas University of the North: Official website
Warmi Huasi Yachana Center: Official website

Center Region

Public
Aeronautical Institute: Official website
National University of Córdoba: Official website
National University of La Pampa: Official website
National University of the Littoral: Official website
National University of Rafaela: Official website
National University of Río Cuarto: Official website
National University of Rosario: Official website
National University of Villa María: Official website

Private
21st Century Enterprise University: Official website
Blaise Pascal University: Official website
Catholic University of Córdoba: Official website
Catholic University of Santa Fe: Official website
University College of Journalism: Official website
University of the Latin American Educational Center: Official website

Cuyo Region

Public
National University of Chilecito: Official website
National University of Comechingones: Official website
National University of Cuyo: Official website
National University of La Rioja: Official website
National University of San Juan: Official website
National University of San Luis: Official website
National University of Villa Mercedes: Official website

Private
Aconcagua University: Official website
Catholic University of Cuyo: Official website
Champagnat University: Official website
Juan Agustín Maza University: Official website
University of Congreso: Official website
University of Mendoza: Official website

Patagonia

Public
National University of Austral Patagonia: Official website
National University of Comahue: Official website
National University of Patagonia San Juan Bosco: Official website
National University of Río Negro: Official website
National University of Tierra del Fuego: Official website

Northeast and Littoral

Public (national)
National University of Alto Uruguay: Official website
National University of the Chaco Austral: Official website
National University of Entre Ríos: Official website
National University of Formosa: Official website
National University of Misiones: Official website
National University of the Northeast: Official website

Public (provincial)
Autonomous University of Entre Ríos: Official website

Private
River Plate Adventist University: Official website
University of Concepción del Uruguay: Official website
University of Cuenca del Plata: Official website

Other universities

International
 A branch of the Latin American Social Sciences Institute: Official website

See also
Argentine University Federation
Science and technology in Argentina
University Revolution

Education in Argentina
 
Universities and colleges
Argentina
Argentina
Universities